The Society for Economic Measurement, or SEM, is a scientific learned society in the field of economics. It was founded on August 24, 2013 by William A. Barnett in order to "promote research on economic measurement, using advanced tools from economic theory, econometrics, aggregation theory, experimental economics, mathematics, and statistics".  Nobel Laureate James Heckman will take over as the society's second president in 2019 for a three-year term in office. The goal of the SEM is to promote in economics—given the constraints of a social science—the implementation of the strict rules of measurement and data gathering standards used in the physical sciences. Carnegie Mellon University, the Center for Financial Stability, and the University of Kansas are sponsors of the society.

Activities
 The inaugural conference of the SEM was held at the Harper Center of the University of Chicago's Booth School of Business on August 18–20, 2014. It was co-sponsored by the Becker Friedman Institute at the University of Chicago.  
 The 2nd SEM conference was held at the OECD in Paris on July 22–24, 2015.
 The 3rd SEM conference was held in Thessaloniki, Greece on July 6–8, 2016.
 The 4th SEM conference was held at the Massachusetts Institute of Technology on July 26–28, 2017.
 The 5th SEM conference will be held at Xiamen University on Xiamen Island in China in June 2108.
 The 6th SEM Conference will be held at Goethe University in Frankfurt, with cosponsorship by the European Central Bank, on August 16–18, 2019.

SEM Fellows 
The full list of the 2013-2014 SEM Fellows is posted here: SEM 2013-2014 Fellows.

Officers
A. EXECUTIVE COMMITTEE:

1. President:
 W. A. Barnett, U. of Kansas and Center for Financial Stability, NY City
2. Vice Presidents:
 Yves Balasko, University of York, UK
 Ernst Berndt (MIT professor), MIT
 Walter Erwin Diewert, U of British Columbia, Canada
 Ester Faia, Goethe University, Germany
 Kaye Husbands Fealing, Georgia Institute of Technology
 Dennis Fixler, Bureau of Economic Analysis, Department of Commerce
 Barbara Fraumeni, U. of Southern Maine; Central U. of Finance and Economics, Beijing
 Dale Jorgenson, Harvard
 Ken Judd, Stanford (Hoover)
 Julia Lane, New York University
 Jacques Mairesse, CREST (ENSAE, Paris), UNU-MERIT (Maastricht University, Maastricht)
 J. Peter Neary, Oxford U., U.K. 
 Paul Schreyer, Deputy Director, OECD Statistics Directorate, Paris
 Apostolos Serletis, U. of Calgary, Canada
 Karl Shell, Cornell
 Marcel Timmer, University of Groningen, Netherlands
 Sevin Yeltekin, Carnegie Mellon U.
3. Members at Large:
 James Heckman, U. of Chicago and University College, Dublin
4. Member by Appointment of the Center for Financial Stability:    
 Lawrence Goodman, President, Center for Financial Stability, NY City    
5. Secretary-Treasurer:
 Stephen Spear, Carnegie Mellon U.
B. COUNCIL:

Charter Council Members:
 Bert Balk, Rotterdam School of Management, Netherlands
 Marcelle Chauvet, U. of California Riverside
 Robert Feenstra, U. of California at Davis
 Kevin Fox, U. of New South Wales
 Steve Hanke, Johns Hopkins U.
 Jonathan Haskel,  Imperial College, London, U.K. 
 Robert Hill, U. of Graz, Austria
 Charles Hulten, U. of Maryland
 Robert Inklaar, U. of Groningen, Netherlands
 Peter Ireland, Boston College
 Fredj Jawadi, U. of Évry and France Business School, France
 Koji Nomura, Keio U., Tokyo, Japan
 Lee Ohanian, UCLA
 Philippe de Peretti, University of Paris 1, Sorbonne, France
 Prasada Rao, University of Queensland, Australia
 Stephen Turnovsky, U. of Washington
 Myrna Wooders, Vanderbilt University
 Nicholas Yannelis, U. of Iowa

References

External links

SEM Official Web Site
SEM's Page at the Center for Financial Stability
SEM's Official Page on Facebook
Becker Friedman Institute

Professional associations based in the United States
Business and finance professional associations
Economics societies
Learned societies of the United States